Cherechiu is a commune in Bihor County, Crișana, Romania with a population of 2,416 people. It is composed of three villages: Cherechiu, Cheșereu (Érkeserű) and Târgușor (Asszonyvására).

References

Communes in Bihor County
Localities in Crișana